Peters Creek is a  stream in San Mateo County, California, and is a tributary of Pescadero Creek. It flows southwestwards through a small canyon to join Pescadero Creek in Portola Redwoods State Park, near La Honda.

Tributaries
Evans Creek
Lambert Creek
Bear Creek

See also
List of watercourses in the San Francisco Bay Area

References

Rivers of San Mateo County, California
Rivers of Santa Cruz County, California
Rivers of Northern California